Don't Save Me may refer to:

 "Don't Save Me" (Marit Larsen song), 2006
 "Don't Save Me" (Haim song), 2012